Astet is a commune in the Ardèche department in the Auvergne-Rhône-Alpes region of southern France.

The inhabitants of the commune are known as Asténiens or Asténiennes.

Geography
Astet is located some 30 km west by north-west of Aubenas and 15 km east by south-east of Langogne. Access to the commune is by Route nationale N102 from Lanarce in the north-west passing through the north of the commune and continuing over the Col de la Chavade in the centre of the commune then south-east to Mayres. The N102 is a heavily used road between the Rhône Valley and the Massif Central. There is also the D239 coming from Saint-Cirgues-en-Montagne in the north-east passing through the centre of the commune, crossing the N102 at the Col de la Chavade and continuing south to join the D19. The village is located in the east of the commune and is reached by a short but tortuous road from the N102. Apart from the village there is also the hamlet of Sedassier to the south-east. The commune covers 3,445 hectares with the highest point at Les Valadous at 1,548m.

The Ardèche river has its source in the centre of the commune and it flows south-west gathering many tributaries in the commune: the Ruisseau des Chaplades, the Ruisseau de Paillayre, the Ruisseau de Pierne, the Ruisseau de la Bessede, the Ruisseau de Fiagouse, the Ruisseau des Gardettes, the Ruisseau de Pierne, and the Ruisseau de la Bessede. It begins its journey to join the Rhône at Pont-Saint-Esprit in Astet. The Espezonnette rises in the south of the commune with many tributaries: the Ruisseau de la Ferme, the Ruisseau du Gouffre, the Ruisseau de Montgros, and the Ruisseau de l'Ane. It flows north forming a small part of the northern border before continuing to join the Allier just south of the Langogne-Lesperon Aerodrome.

Neighbouring communes and villages

History
First established as a parish in 1770, Astet became a commune in 1907 by separating from the large commune of Mayres. Astet had over 500 inhabitants in 1911 but this has decreased to 41 in 2010. The First World War resulted in a reduction in population then the desertification of the land in the 1950s.

Administration

List of Successive Mayors

Demography
In 2017, the commune had 42 inhabitants.

Sites and monuments
Les Valadous the highest point in the Serre de la Croix de Bauzon at 1,548m.
Col de la Chavade
Col du Pendu
La Chavade-Bel-Air Ski Resort
A Church from the 19th century
The source of the Ardèche river in the Mazan Forest
Wind turbines operated by Électricité de France

The GR7 path passes through the centre of the commune parallel with the D239.

See also
Communes of the Ardèche department

References

External links

Community of communes website on the Source of the Ardèche 
Astet on the old IGN website 
Astet on Géoportail, National Geographic Institute (IGN) website 
Astet on the 1750 Cassini Map

Communes of Ardèche